Horseshoe Falls is one of seven waterfalls on the Murtle River west of Murtle Lake in Wells Gray Provincial Park, east-central British Columbia, Canada.

The waterfall was discovered by  Joseph Hunter, a surveyor working for the future Canadian Pacific Railway, on May 26, 1874. Hunter did not name the falls, but he did name the Murtle River and Murtle Lake for his birthplace in Scotland, Milton of Murtle, near Aberdeen. Horseshoe Falls was named in 1914 by land surveyor Robert Henry Lee, who mapped homesteaders' lots along the south side of the Murtle River.

Horseshoe Falls can be reached by a  hiking trail from Pyramid Campground on Clearwater Valley Road. The trail passes volcanic Pyramid Mountain and Majerus Falls, and ends at Horseshoe Falls.

References

Waterfalls of British Columbia
Wells Gray-Clearwater
Kamloops Division Yale Land District